Noto is a city and  in the Province of Syracuse, Sicily, Italy. It lends its name to the surrounding area Val di Noto. In 2002 Noto and its church were declared a UNESCO World Heritage Site.

Etymology
Noto is regarded as having a possible Ancient Greek etymology. Likely, the name is derived from "south" (Greek: Νότιο Πήλιο), as in Notion and Notio Aigaio.

History

The old town, Noto Antica, lies  directly north on Mount Alveria. A city of Sicel origin, it was known as Netum in ancient times. In 263 BCE the city was granted to Hiero II by the Romans. According to legend, Daedalus stayed in the city after his flight over the Ionian Sea, as did Hercules after his seventh task. During the Roman era, it opposed the magistrate Verres.

In 866 it was conquered by the Muslims, who elevated the city to become a capital of one of the three districts of the island (the Val di Noto). In 1091, it became the last Islamic stronghold in Sicily to fall to the Christians. Later it became a rich Norman city.

In the 16th and 17th centuries, the city was home to several notable intellectual figures, including Giovanni Aurispa, jurists Andrea Barbazio and Antonio Corsetto, as well as architect Matteo Carnelivari and composer Mario Capuana. In 1503 King Ferdinand III granted it the title of civitas ingeniosa ("Ingenious City"). In the following centuries, the city expanded, growing beyond its medieval limits, and new buildings, churches and convents were built.

The medieval town of Noto was virtually razed by the 1693 Sicilian earthquake. Over half the population is said to have died from the earthquake. It was decided to rebuild the town at the present site, on the left bank of the River Asinaro, closer to the Ionian shore. These circumstances have led this town to have a unique architectural homogeneity since the core of the town was all built over the next decades after the calamity in what is a typical and highly preserved example of Sicilian baroque. The layout followed a grid system by Giovanni Battista Landolina and utilized the sloping hillside for scenographic effects. The architects Rosario Gagliardi, Francesco Sortino and others each participated in designing multiple structures. The town was dubbed the "Stone Garden" by Cesare Brandi and is currently listed among UNESCO's World Heritage Sites. Many of the newer structures are built of a soft tufa stone, which assumes a honey tonality under sunlight. Parts of the cathedral, however, unexpectedly collapsed in 1996.

The city, which had lost its provincial capital status in 1817, rebelled against the House of Bourbon on 16 May 1860, leaving its gates open to Giuseppe Garibaldi and his expedition. Five months later, on 21 October, a plebiscite sealed the annexation of Noto to Piedmont.

In 1844, Noto was named a diocese, but in 1866 suffered the abolition of the religious guilds, which had been deeply linked to the city's structures and buildings.

Noto was freed from the fascist dictatorship of Benito Mussolini in July 1943. The Notinesi people voted in favour of the monarchy in the referendum of 1946.

Main sights 

Noto is famous for its buildings from the early 18th century, many of which are considered to be among the finest examples of Sicilian baroque style. It is a place of many religious buildings and several palaces.

Palazzi and other buildings
Palazzo Ducezio, the current town hall. Designed by Vincenzo Sinatra, it houses neo-classical style frescos by Antonio Mazza.
Palazzo Astuto.
Palazzo di Villadorata on via Nicolaci which was built by P. Labisi in 1733. 
Palazzo di Lorenzo del Castelluccio
Town Library

Religious buildings
Noto Cathedral (Cattedrale di San Nicolò di Mira, finished in 1776)
Santa Agata church
Sant'Andrea Apostolo church
Anime Sante del Purgatorio ("Holy Souls of the Purgatory") church
Annunziata church
Sant'Antonio Abate church
Santa Caterina church
Santa Chiara church, with a precious Madonna (by Antonello Gagini), and Benedictine monastery, 
Church of San Francesco d'Assisi (Immacolata)
San Carlo al Corso church, designed by Rosario Gagliardi
Collegio di San Carlo church
San Corrado church
Santissimo Crocifisso church
Crociferio di San Camillo church
San Domenico church by Rosario Gagliardi
Ecce Homo church
Sant'Egidio Vescovo church
San Girolamo church also known as Chiesa di Montevergine
Santa Maria dell'Arco: church and former Cistercian monastery, founded in 1212 under the patronage of Count Isimberto or Isemberto di Morengia and is wife Sara The church moved from Arco to the old Noto, then after 1693 to the new Noto. Church designed by Rosario Gagliardi. The monastery was closed by 1789, and little remains of the original structure.
Santa Maria del Carmelo church
Santa Maria del Gesù church
Santa Maria della Rotonda church
Santa Maria della Scala church
San Michele Arcangelo church
San Nicola di Mira church
Sacro Nome di Gesu church
San Pietro Martire church
San Pietro delle Rose (Saints Peter and Paul) church
Santissimo Salvatore church
Santissimo Salvatore: church and benedictine convent (1735), designed by Gagliardi. It has an oval plant, the interior divided by twelve columns housing a Madonna with Child from the 16th century
Spirito Santo church
Santissima Trinità church

Archaeological sites
The remains of Noto's ancient structures are almost entirely hidden beneath the ruins of the mediaeval town, except for three chambers cut into the rock. One is noted by an inscription in the library at Noto to have belonged to a gymnasium, while the other two were heroa (shrines of heroes). Explorations have discovered four cemeteries dating to the third Sicel period and one from the Greek period. Among other finds are catacombs of the Christian period and several Byzantine tombs.

In the 3rd century BC, a tomb was excavated in the rectangular area which surrounds it, destroying an apparently pre-existing tomb. Remnants of a later burial site belonging to the necropolis of the small town of Helorus,  to the southeast, have been discovered. The Villa Romana del Tellaro is a Roman villa located south of Noto.

Culture

In the Noto neighbourhood, a 32-m radiotelescope was installed by the Istituto di Radioastronomia di Bologna as part of the Consiglio Nazionale delle Ricerche. It works in collaboration with a similar instrument in Medicina, Bologna. 

The city has held an annual flower festival, the Infiorata, every May since the 1980s, lining the Corrado Nicolaci with floral mosaics.

One episode of the movie L'Avventura (1960) directed by Michelangelo Antonioni was shot in Noto and features views of its cathedral and square.

Economy
The local area is home to several quality wine producers.

Gallery

See also
Sicilian Baroque
Val di Noto
Roman Catholic Diocese of Noto

References

Sicily and Its Islands, 2004 - Ugo La Rosa editore

Further reading
 Adler, Nancy Lockwood. "Noto: A City Rebuilt" History Today (Sept 1983), Vol. 33 Issue 9, pp 39–42.

External links
Noto in Sicily 
Webcam on Cathedral of San Nicolò
Il Portale su Noto
Accommodation Center of Noto 

 
Coastal towns in Sicily
Municipalities of the Province of Syracuse
Sicilian Baroque
Wine regions of Italy
World Heritage Sites in Italy